Casapinta is a comune (municipality) in the Province of Biella in the Italian region Piedmont, located about  northeast of Turin and about  northeast of Biella.

Casapinta borders the following municipalities: Crosa, Curino, Lessona, Masserano, Mezzana Mortigliengo, Strona.

Demographic evolution

References

Cities and towns in Piedmont